Ton is the name of any one of several units of measure. It has a long history and has acquired several meanings and uses.

Mainly it describes units of mass.  Confusion can arise because ton can mean
 the long ton, which is 
 the short ton, which is 
 the tonne, also called the metric ton, which is 1,000 kilograms (about 2,204.6226218 pounds) or 1 megagram.

Recent specialized uses include the ton as a measure of energy and as a means of truck classification. It can also be used as a unit of energy, or in refrigeration as a unit of power, sometimes called a ton of refrigeration.

Because the ton (of any system of measuring weight) is usually the heaviest unit named in colloquial speech, its name also has figurative uses, singular and plural, informally meaning a large amount or quantity, or to a great degree, as in "There's a ton of bees in this hive", "We have tons of homework", and "I love you a ton."

History
The ton is derived from the tun, the term applied to a cask of the largest capacity.

Units of mass/weight
There are several similar units of mass or volume called the ton.

Where precision is required the correct term should be used, as the difference between the short ton and the other common forms ("long" and "metric") is about 10%. However, when comparing between the metric and long tons, precision may not be as necessary as they differ by only 1.6%.

The metric tonne is usually distinguished by its spelling when written, but in the US and UK it is pronounced the same as ton, hence is often spoken as "metric ton" when it is necessary to make the distinction. In the UK the final "e" of "tonne" can also be pronounced,. In Australia, it is pronounced .

In the United Kingdom, the (Imperial) ton is a statute measure, defined as 2,240 pounds (about ).

In the United States and Canada, a ton is defined to be .

Other units of mass/weight
Deadweight ton (abbreviation 'DWT' or 'dwt') is a measure of a ship's carrying capacity, including bunker oil, fresh water, ballast water, crew and provisions. It is expressed in tonnes (1,000 kg) or long tons. This measurement is also used in the U.S. tonnage of naval ships.
 Increasingly, tonnes are being used rather than long tons in measuring the displacement of ships.
Harbour ton, used in South Africa in the 20th century, was equivalent to 2,000 pounds or one short ton.

Assay ton (abbreviation 'AT') is not a unit of measurement but a standard quantity used in assaying ores of precious metals. A short assay ton is  grams while a long assay ton is  gram. These amounts bear the same ratio to a milligram as a short or long ton bears to a troy ounce. Therefore, the number of milligrams of a particular metal found in a sample weighing one assay ton gives the number of troy ounces of metal contained in a ton of ore.

In documents that predate 1960 the word ton is sometimes spelled tonne, but in more recent documents tonne refers exclusively to the metric ton.

In nuclear power plants tHM and MTHM mean tonnes of heavy metals, and MTU means tonnes of uranium. In the steel industry, the abbreviation THM means 'tons/tonnes hot metal', which refers to the amount of liquid iron or steel that is produced, particularly in the context of blast furnace production or specific consumption.

A dry ton or dry tonne has the same mass value, but the material (sludge, slurries, compost, and similar mixtures in which solid material is soaked with or suspended in water) has been dried to a relatively low, consistent moisture level (dry weight). If the material is in its natural, wet state, it is called a wet ton or wet tonne.

Subdivisions
Both the UK definition of long ton and US definition of short ton have the same underlying basis.  Each is equivalent to 20 long or short hundredweight, being  and  respectively.

Before the twentieth century there were several definitions. In the nineteenth century in different parts of Britain, definitions of 2,240, 2,352, and 2,400 lb were used, with 2,000 lb for explosives; the legal ton was usually 2,240 lb.

In the United Kingdom, Canada, Australia, and other areas that had used the imperial system, the tonne is the form of ton legal in trade.

Units of volume

The displacement, essentially the weight, of a ship is traditionally expressed in long tons. To simplify measurement it is determined by measuring the volume, rather than weight, of water displaced, and calculating the weight from the volume and density.
For practical purposes the displacement ton (DT) is a unit of volume, the approximate volume occupied by one ton of seawater (the actual volume varies with salinity and temperature). It is slightly less than the 224 imperial gallons (1.018 m3) of the water ton (based on distilled water).

It is used to determine the amount of money to be charged in loading, unloading, or carrying different sorts of cargo. In general if a cargo is heavier than salt water, the actual tonnage is used. If it is lighter than salt water, e.g. feathers, freight is calculated using Measurement Tons of 40 cubic feet.

Gross tonnage and net tonnage are volumetric measures of the cargo-carrying capacity of a ship.

The Panama Canal/Universal Measurement System (PC/UMS) is based on net tonnage, modified for Panama Canal billing purposes. PC/UMS is based on a mathematical formula to calculate a vessel's total volume; a PC/UMS net ton is equivalent to 100 cubic feet of capacity.

Units of energy and power

Ton of TNT

A ton of TNT or tonne of TNT is a unit of energy equal to 109 (thermochemical) calories, also known as a gigacalorie (Gcal), equal to 4.184 gigajoules (GJ).
A kiloton of TNT or kilotonne of TNT is a unit of energy equal to 1012 calories, also known as a teracalorie (Tcal), equal to 4.184 terajoules (TJ).
A megaton of TNT (1,000,000 tonnes) or megatonne of TNT is a unit of energy equal to 1015 calories, also known (infrequently) as a petacalorie (Pcal), equal to 4.184 petajoules (PJ).

Note that these are small calories (cal). The large or dietary calorie (Cal) is equal to one kilocalorie (kcal), and is gradually being replaced by the latter correct term.

Early values for the explosive energy released by trinitrotoluene (TNT) ranged from 900 to 1100 calories per gram. In order to standardise the use of the term TNT as a unit of energy, an arbitrary value was assigned based on 1,000 calories per gram. Thus there is no longer a direct connection to the chemical TNT itself. It is now merely a unit of energy that happens to be expressed using words normally associated with mass (e.g., kilogram, tonne, pound). The definition applies for both spellings: ton of TNT and tonne of TNT.

Measurements in tons of TNT have been used primarily to express nuclear weapon yields, though they have also been used since in seismology as well.

Tonne of oil equivalent
A tonne of oil equivalent (toe), sometimes ton of oil equivalent, is a conventional value, based on the amount of energy released by burning one tonne of crude oil. The unit is used, for example, by the International Energy Agency (IEA), for the reported world energy consumption as TPES in millions of toe (Mtoe).

Other sources convert 1 toe into 1.28 tonne of coal equivalent (tce). 1 toe is also standardized as 7.33 barrel of oil equivalent (boe).

Tonne of coal equivalent
A tonne of coal equivalent (tce), sometimes ton of coal equivalent, is a conventional value, based on the amount of energy released by burning one tonne of coal. Plural name is tonnes of coal equivalent.
 Per the World Coal Association: 1 tonne of coal equivalent (tce) corresponds to 0.697 tonne of oil equivalent (toe)
 Per the International Energy Agency 1 tonne of coal equivalent (tce) corresponds to 0.700 tonne of oil equivalent (toe)

Refrigeration 

The unit ton is used in refrigeration and air conditioning to measure the rate of heat absorption. Prior to the introduction of mechanical refrigeration, cooling was accomplished by delivering ice.  Installing one ton of mechanical refrigeration capacity replaced the daily delivery of one ton of ice.

 A less common usage is the power required to cool 1 long ton ( = ) of water by  every 10 minutes = .

The refrigeration ton is commonly abbreviated as RT.

Informal tons
Ton is also used informally, often as slang, to mean a large amount of something.
In Britain, a ton is colloquially used to refer to 100 of a given unit. Ton can thus refer to a speed of 100 miles per hour, and is prefixed by an indefinite article, e.g. "Lee was doing a ton down the motorway"; to money e.g. "How much did you pay for that?" "A ton" (£100); to 100 points in a game e.g. "Eric just threw a ton in our darts game" (in some games, e.g. cricket, more commonly called a century); or to a hundred of any other countable figure.
In Dutch, when talking about money a ton is used to indicate 100,000. For example a house costing 2 ton would cost 200,000 euros.  This convention has been in use since at least the 18th century.
In Finnish,  is often used as a synonym for 1,000, especially when referring to money. For example,  was a 1000-mark banknote, and a popular TV show was called  ("ten tons" = 10,000 marks).

See also

Conversion of units
Systems of measurement
English units
Imperial units
United States customary units
Gross ton mile

References

Units of mass
Units of volume
Customary units of measurement in the United States
Imperial units

de:Tonne (Einheit) 
no:Megagram
nn:Megagram
te:టన్